Federation of Christian Democracy (FDC) was a Spanish political organization formed on April 14, 1977 by Democratic Left of Joaquín Ruiz-Giménez and Democratic People's Federation of José María Gil-Robles y Quiñones.

It was led by Manuel Hidalgo, Juan Bermúdez de Castro, Francisco Soroeta and Cristóbal García. It formed a coalition with the Democratic Union of the Valencian Country called Christian Democratic Team of the Spanish State (EDCEE) for the general elections of 1977. After the election failure (215,000 votes and a little more than 1% of the vote), on September 24, 1977 Democratic Left withdrew from the federation, and it merged with other political groups within the Christian Democracy in a founding congress on 4 and 5 February 1978.

Members
At the time of the 1977 elections, the Federation of Christian Democracy was composed of:

 Democratic People's Federation
 Christian Democracy of Castile
 Basque Christian Democracy
 Murcian Christian Democracy
 Western Christian Democracy
 Aragonese Christian Democracy
 Andalusian Democratic People's Party
 Democratic Left

References

Defunct political party alliances in Spain
1977 establishments in Spain
1978 disestablishments in Spain
Political parties established in 1977
Political parties disestablished in 1978